Van Herk is a surname. Notable people with the surname include:

Aritha Van Herk (born 1954), Canadian writer, critic, editor, educator, and professor
Gerard van Herk, Canadian musician and linguist

See also
1752 van Herk, a main-belt asteroid

Surnames of Dutch origin